Maryam Goumbassian (1831, Constantinople – 1909) was an Ottoman Armenian actress. She belonged to the very first group of female actors in the Ottoman Empire, having debuted in 1862. Prior to her career on stage, she had been a governess. She retired in 1884.

References 
 Duygu Köksal,Anastasia Falierou: A Social History of Late Ottoman Women: New Perspectives
 Women in the Ottoman Empire by Eric R Dursteler, Oxford Reference Online

1831 births
1909 deaths
19th-century actresses from the Ottoman Empire
Ethnic Armenian actresses
Armenians from the Ottoman Empire
19th-century Armenian actors
Stage actresses from the Ottoman Empire